Perú is a station on Line A of the Buenos Aires Underground.  Passengers may transfer from here to the Catedral Station on Line D and to the Bolívar Station on Line E.

History
This station belonged to the first section of line opened on 1 December 1913, linking the stations Plaza Miserere and Plaza de Mayo. The name corresponds to the street that is above the intersection with Mayo Avenue.

In the 1970s it became Argentina's first metro A line equipped with a pair of escalators.

Gallery

References

External links

Buenos Aires Underground stations
Railway stations opened in 1913
1913 establishments in Argentina